The beach of Agios Andreas is just outside the town center of Ierapetra in Crete.

It is a sandy beach with a rocky coastline and crystal clear waters, like all beaches in Ierapetra. Also, the beach is ideal for snorkelling.

References
Beaches ierapetra.net
Beaches of Ierapetra cretenbeaches.com

Beaches of Crete
Landforms of Lasithi